This is a worldwide list of tram builders.  Trams may also be called streetcars or trolleys in certain countries.  These companies are, or at one time were, manufacturers of genuine trams/streetcars. Makers of replica-tram buses are not listed.



Argentina
 Fabricaciones Militares
 Materfer

Australia
 Randwick Tramway Workshops, Sydney, NSW
 Hudson Brothers, Sydney, NSW
 Bignall and Morrison, Sydney, NSW
 E. Chambers, Sydney, NSW
 Newstead Tram Cars – Historic-tramcar replicas
 Bendigo Tramways  Historic-tramcar replicas
 Holden Motor Body Builders. Later to become General Motors Holden.

Belarus
 Belkommunmash

Brazil
 Bom Sinal

Bulgaria
 Tramkar

Canada
 Bombardier Transportation - Thunder Bay, Ontario - Sold to Alstom in 2020.

China
 Bombardier Transportation, China
 CRRC

Croatia
 Crotram
 Đuro Đaković (factory)  (produced trams, 1957–1993)
 ZET Zagreb (produced trams, 1922–1951)

Czech Republic
 Inekon Trams
 Pragoimex 
 Škoda Transportation

Finland
 Škoda Transtech

France
 Alstom

Germany
 Adtranz (also in Sweden; bought out by Bombardier in 2001)
 Bremer Waggonbau (founded 1975, closed 1995)
 Duewag (sold to Siemens in 1999)
 Gothaer Waggonfabrik
 Hansa Waggonbau (foundet 1946, closed 1975)
 Norddeutsche Waggonfabrik (foundet 1908, closed 1930)
 Siemens

Hong Kong
 Hong Kong Tramways

Hungary
 Ganz (subsidiary of Škoda Transportation)

India
 Bharat Earth Movers
 Jessop India
 Premier Manufacturer

Italy
 AnsaldoBreda - Sold to Hitachi Rail in 2015.
  SpA
 Officine Ferroviarie Meridionali
 Carminati & Toselli
 Officine Meccaniche della Stanga

Japan
 
 Japan Transport Engineering Company
 Kawasaki Heavy Industries Rolling Stock Company
 Kinki Sharyo
 Niigata Transys Company
 Nippon Sharyo
 Hitachi
 Sapporo Sougou Tekkou Kyodoukumiai

New Zealand
 DSC Cousins & Cousins, formerly Cousins & Atkins
 Henderson & Pollard, Auckland
 Auckland City Corporation Tramways
 Auckland Transport Board
 Boon & Co, Christchurch
 Lyons and Co, Wellington
 Rouse & Hurrell, Wellington
 Rouse and Black, Wellington
 Wellington City Corporation
 Dunedin City Corporation Tramways

Poland
 FPS "Cegielski"
 Konstal
 Newag
 Pesa Bydgoszcz
 Solaris

Romania
 Astra Vagoane Arad
 Electroputere VFU Pașcani
 URAC Bucharest

Russia
 Ust-Katav Vagon-Building Plant
 Uraltransmash
 PK Transportnye Sistemy

Spain
 Construcciones y Auxiliar de Ferrocarriles (CAF)

Sweden
 Adtranz (also in Germany; bought out by Bombardier in 2001)

Switzerland
 Schindler Waggon
 SIG Combibloc Group
 Stadler

Turkey
 Durmazlar (Durmaray)
 Bozankaya

Ukraine
 Electron corporation

United Kingdom
 Brush Electrical Engineering Company
 Tram Power

United States 
 Brookville Equipment Corporation (2002–)
 Gomaco Trolley Company (1982–) – Historic-streetcar replicas
 TIG/M Self-powered electric and hydrogen streetcars

Defunct

Argentina 
 CATITA

Austria 
 Simmering-Graz-Pauker (SGP)

Australia 
 Clyde Engineering, Sydney, NSW
 Commonwealth Engineering
 Duncan & Fraser, Adelaide, SA
 Eveleigh Railway Workshops, Sydney, NSW
 Meadowbank Manufacturing Company, Sydney, NSW
 Melbourne & Metropolitan Tramways Board, Preston Workshops, Victoria.
 Ritchie Brothers, Auburn, Sydney, NSW
 Walsh Island Dockyard, Newcastle, NSW

Canada 
 Urban Transportation Development Corporation - Thunder Bay, Ontario 1973–1990s (used old CC&F plant)
 Hawker Siddeley Canada - Thunder Bay, Ontario, 1962–2001 (old CC&F plant)
 Canadian Car and Foundry - Montreal, Quebec, 1909–1913; 1940s
 Ottawa Car Company - Ottawa, Ontario, 1891–1948
 Preston Car Company - Preston, Ontario (now Cambridge, Ontario), 1908–1921, bought by Brill
 Toronto Railway Company - Toronto, Ontario, 1891–1920, wooden cars for mostly in-house use only, but built some cars for Mexico and Western Canadian operators by subsidiary Convertible Car Company of Toronto
 James Crossen-Cobourg Car Works - Cobourg, Ontario, 1890–1915

Czech Republic 
 ČKD (1951–1999)
 Vagónka Tatra Česká Lípa (produced trams, 1929–1954)
 Vagónka Tatra Studénka (produced trams, 1902–1951)
 Královopolská strojírna (produced trams, 1903–1951)

Latvia 
 RVR (Rīgas Vagonu Rupnīca) (ex—"Fenikss")

Netherlands 
 Allan
 Beijnes
 Werkspoor

New Zealand 
 Auckland Electric Tramways

Poland 
 Protram

Romania 
 Societatea de Transport Public Timișoara (1921–1977)
 Electrometal Timișoara (Eltim) (1977–1990)
 Electroputere Craiova (1954–1982)

Russia 
 Saint Petersburg Tramway-Mechanical Plant

Switzerland 
 Schweizerische Wagons- und Aufzügefabrik AG Schlieren-Zürich (SWS)

United Kingdom 
 Dick, Kerr & Co
 English Electric
 Maley & Taunton

United States 
 American Car Company (1891–1931)
 JG Brill Company (1868–1956, but streetcar production ended in 1941)
 Cincinnati Car Company (1902–1938)
 Edwards Rail Car Company (1997–2008) – Historic-streetcar replicas
 Gilbert Car Company (1840s–1895)
 W. L. Holman Car Company (1883–1913)
 Jewett Car Company (1894–1918)
 G. C. Kuhlman Car Company (1892–1932)
 Niles Car and Manufacturing Company (1901–1917)
 Pullman Company/Pullman Standard (1891–1952 for streetcars)
 St Louis Car Company (1887–1973)
 John Stephenson Company (1831–1917)
 Perley A. Thomas Car Works (1917–1936; bus manufacturer from 1936 on)
 United Streetcar (2005–2015) – Low-floor modern streetcars

See also

 List of rolling stock manufacturers
 List of locomotive builders
 List of railway companies

References

 List of manufacturers
Tram manufacturers
Tram manufacturers